Charles Ray McCoy (born March 28, 1941) is a Grammy-winning American session musician, harmonica player, and multi-instrumentalist. In 2009, he was inducted into the Country Music Hall of Fame. Based in Nashville, McCoy's playing is heard on recordings by Elvis Presley, Bob Dylan, Johnny Cash, Chet Atkins, Waylon Jennings, Leon Russell, and Loretta Lynn. He has recorded thirty-seven studio albums, including fourteen for Monument Records. Thirteen of his singles have entered the Billboard country charts. He was a member of Area Code 615 and Barefoot Jerry. In 2007, McCoy was inducted into the International Musicians Hall of Fame as a part a group of session musicians dubbed "The Nashville A-Team". In 2022, he was invited to become a member of the Grand Ole Opry.

Early life
McCoy was born in Oak Hill, West Virginia, United States. His family moved to nearby Fayetteville when he was a boy and then to Miami, Florida. At age eight, he began playing the harmonica, starting on an instrument his mother bought for 50 cents. He also learned to play the guitar, and in his teens, the bass and trumpet. While attending Southwest Miami high school, he put together a rock and roll band called "Charlie McCoy and the Agendas" as a guitarist and singer. At age sixteen he reluctantly accompanied a friend to a Miami-based country music barn dance radio show  called the "Old South Jamboree". Upon their arrival, McCoy's friend left him in the crowd and went to talk to Happy Harold, the host of the show, with the intention of coaxing McCoy up on stage to sing. McCoy's performance that night, along with the positive response from the audience, led to him and his band being signed to the Old South Jamboree. His band consisted of Donny Lytle, later known as Johnny Paycheck, on bass; Bill Johnson on steel guitar; Charlie Justice on guitar; and Bill Phillips, vocal. About this time the band took part in a local rock and roll contest, winning first prize. During this time skills had developed to where he decided to pursue a career in music.

Development
Following an invitation from Mel Tillis, the eighteen-year-old McCoy went to Nashville, Tennessee, for a week's stay in 1959. During his stay in Nashville he visited numerous producers and record companies but all to no avail. Since his efforts to start a musical career in Nashville had failed, he went back to Miami. He enrolled at the Miami University, majoring in musical education. His goal was now to become a teacher. Meanwhile, he continued to perform on the "Jamboree". When Miami faculty members discovered that he was playing rock and roll for a square dance, they warned him not to continue with such "lower forms of music". McCoy replied that he was willing to quit his work at the barn dance if they would give him a scholarship. The faculty rejected his request.

McCoy, who still wanted to make a career in music, applied for the vacant job as guitarist in John Ferguson's band. But when he arrived in Nashville, his job had already been taken by guitarist Vance Bullock. After a short discussion Ferguson decided to hire McCoy as a drummer instead. McCoy bought a drum set and joined the band. John Ferguson's band was unsuccessful, and they soon disbanded. After a month of unemployment he joined Stonewall Jackson as a drummer. The job came to an end in the autumn that year. He then received a call from the booking agent Jim Denney, who informed him that Archie Bleyer of Cadence Records had listened to McCoy's tapes and wanted to sign him. McCoy cut his first single, "Cherry Berry Wine", for the Cadence label; it reached No. 99 on the Billboard chart. In Nashville, Denney advised him to do demo sessions and to concentrate on the harmonica. Next, McCoy joined Wayne Moss as a bass player, performing at Fort Campbell in Kentucky.

Big break
Chet Atkins heard one of McCoy's demo tapes and immediately hired him in May 1961. His first recording as a harmonica player was the song "I Just Don't Understand", by Ann-Margret for RCA. Fred Foster of Monument Records also heard about McCoy and hired him as harmonica player on Roy Orbison's song "Candy Man". When the song became a million-seller, McCoy's prominent harmonica throughout the song drew notice. He continued to record for the Monument label without a written contract. Although some of his singles and albums at this time did not sell, Foster believed in McCoy's music. Tex Davis, the promoter for Monument Records, was persuaded by Charlie Dillard of WPFA to release "Today I Started Loving You Again" from McCoy's second LP as a single. When it came out in 1972 it sold 750 000 copies and went to No. 16 in the Billboard country charts. For his next album, The Real McCoy, he won a Grammy from the National Academy of Recording Arts and Sciences. His album Good Time Charlie reached No. 1 in the Billboard country chart. During the 1970s, McCoy participated as a studio musician in over 400 sessions a year. He has won two CMA Awards and seven ACM Awards.

Success
From there, he went on to play harmonica for other acts, Elvis Presley, Perry Como, Joan Baez, Steve Miller Band, Johnny Cash, Buffy Sainte-Marie, Kris Kristofferson, Paul Simon, Barefoot Jerry, on Ringo Starr's Beaucoups of Blues, on Gene Summers' Gene Summers in Nashville and 12 Golden Country Greats by Ween. In the fifteen-year period at the height of his activity, McCoy played on over 400 recording sessions per year. He also played guitar on Dylan's "Desolation Row", from the album Highway 61 Revisited; and "Sad Eyed Lady of the Lowlands", from the album Blonde on Blonde; bass guitar (on all the tracks from Bob Dylan's John Wesley Harding); keyboards, and drums plus several wind and brass instruments. For 19 years McCoy worked as music director for the popular television show Hee Haw, and was a member of the Million Dollar Band, a group of all-star session musicians who performed on the show.

On May 17, 2009, McCoy was inducted into the Country Music Hall of Fame along with Roy Clark and Barbara Mandrell. He is also a member of the International Musicians' Hall of Fame and the West Virginia Music Hall of Fame. In May 2016, West Virginia University awarded McCoy an Honorary Doctor of Musical Arts.

In 2017, The West Virginia University Press published Fifty Cents and a Box Top The Creative Life of Nashville Session Musician Charlie McCoy.

During the Saturday night broadcast on June 11, 2022, McCoy was invited to become a member of the Grand Ole Opry by Vince Gill. The date of induction remains to be announced.

Personal life
McCoy has two children with his first wife and five grandchildren. Each of his grandchildren has contributed to one of his albums in some way. His second granddaughter did the artwork for three album covers (Somewhere Over The Rainbow, Smooth Sailing, Celtic Dreams) and sang on one of his Christmas CDs. His oldest granddaughter played flute and sang on a few of his albums. Each of the youngest three has sung on one of his albums, as has his son (Charlie, Jr.) and daughter (Ginger).

Television

Television appearances as an artist
 Hee Haw
 Music City Tonight
 Nashville Now
 CMA Awards Show
 Arthritis Telethon
 The Mike Douglas Show
 The Midnight Special
 The Colgate Country Showdown
 That Good Old Nashville Music
 Pop Goes The Country
 New Country
 The Orange Blossom Special
 The Hee Haw Honeys
 The Johnny Cash Show
 Prime Time Country
 Nashville Swing Canada
 The Val Doonican Show England
 The West Virginia Music Hall Of Fame Awards Show 2008
 Larry's Country Diner

Television shows as a music director
 Hee Haw
 The Colgate Country Showdown
 The Nashville Palace
 The Hee Haw Honeys
 The Hee Haw 10th Anniversary Show
 The Hee Haw 20th Anniversary Show
 Happy New Year From Opryland
 The Charlie Daniels Christmas Special
 The Mickey Gilley Arthritis Telethon
 Tootsie's, Where the Songs Began
 Country Gold
 The International Musicians Hall Of Fame Awards Show 2008

Discography

Albums (incomplete)
{| class="wikitable"
|-
!Year
!Album
!width=45|US Country
!width=45|US
!Label
|-
|1967
|The World of Charlie McCoy
| style="text-align:center;"|
| style="text-align:center;"|
|rowspan=15|Monument
|-
|1968
|The Real McCoy (First Version)
| style="text-align:center;"|
| style="text-align:center;"|
|-
|rowspan=2|1972
|The Real McCoy (Hot Dog Bun Cover)
| style="text-align:center;"|2
| style="text-align:center;"|98
|-
|Charlie McCoy
| style="text-align:center;"|7
| style="text-align:center;"|120
|-
|rowspan=2|1973
|Good Time Charlie
| style="text-align:center;"|1
| style="text-align:center;"|155
|-
|The Fastest Harp in the South
| style="text-align:center;"|2
| style="text-align:center;"|213
|-
|rowspan=2|1974
|The Nashville Hit Man
| style="text-align:center;"|13
| style="text-align:center;"|
|-
|Christmas
| style="text-align:center;"|
| style="text-align:center;"|
|-
|rowspan=2|1975
|Charlie My Boy
| style="text-align:center;"|36
| style="text-align:center;"|
|-
|Harpin' the Blues
| style="text-align:center;"|34
| style="text-align:center;"|
|-
|1976
|Play It Again Charlie
| style="text-align:center;"|48
| style="text-align:center;"|
|-
|rowspan=2|1977
|Country Cookin'''
| style="text-align:center;"|
| style="text-align:center;"|
|-
|Stone Fox Chase (Issued in UK Only)
| style="text-align:center;"|
| style="text-align:center;"|
|-
|1978
|Greatest Hits| style="text-align:center;"|
| style="text-align:center;"|
|-
|1979
|Appalachian Fever| style="text-align:center;"|
| style="text-align:center;"|
|-
|1988
|Charlie McCoy's 13th| style="text-align:center;"|
| style="text-align:center;"|
|rowspan=3|Step One
|-
|1989
|Beam Me Up Charlie| style="text-align:center;"|
| style="text-align:center;"|
|-
|1991
|Out on a Limb| style="text-align:center;"|
| style="text-align:center;"|
|-
|1995
|American Roots| style="text-align:center;"|
| style="text-align:center;"|
|Koka Media (France)
|-
|1998
|Precious Memories| style="text-align:center;"|
| style="text-align:center;"|
|Revival (UK)
|-
|2003
|Classic Country| style="text-align:center;"|
| style="text-align:center;"|
|Green Hill
|-
|2007
|A Celtic Bridge| style="text-align:center;"|
| style="text-align:center;"|
|rowspan=5|Flying Harp
|-
|2010
|Duets (Volume One)| style="text-align:center;"|
| style="text-align:center;"|
|-
|2013
|Smooth Sailing| style="text-align:center;"|
| style="text-align:center;"|
|-
|2015
|Celtic Dreams| style="text-align:center;"|
| style="text-align:center;"|
|-
|2017
|Ear Candy| style="text-align:center;"|
| style="text-align:center;"|
|-
|}

Singles
{| class="wikitable"
|-
!rowspan=2|Year
!rowspan=2|Song
!colspan=3|Chart Positions
!rowspan=2|Album
|-
!width=45|US Country
!width=45|US
!width=45|CAN Country
|-
|1961
|"Cherry Berry Wine"
| style="text-align:center;"|—
| style="text-align:center;"|99
| style="text-align:center;"|—
|single only
|-
|1968
|"Gimmie Some Lovin'/The Boy From England"
| style="text-align:center;"|—
| style="text-align:center;"|—
| style="text-align:center;"|—
|The World of Charlie McCoy (promotional single only)
|-
|rowspan=3|1972
|"Today I Started Loving You Again"
| style="text-align:center;"|16
| style="text-align:center;"|—
| style="text-align:center;"|13
|The Real McCoy|-
|"I'm So Lonesome I Could Cry"
| style="text-align:center;"|23
| style="text-align:center;"|—
| style="text-align:center;"|21
|rowspan=2|Charlie McCoy|-
|"I Really Don't Want to Know"
| style="text-align:center;"|19
| style="text-align:center;"|—
| style="text-align:center;"|19
|-
|rowspan=3|1973
|"Orange Blossom Special"
| style="text-align:center;"|26
| style="text-align:center;"|101
| style="text-align:center;"|24
|rowspan=2|Good Time Charlie|-
|"Shenandoah"
| style="text-align:center;"|33
| style="text-align:center;"|—
| style="text-align:center;"|37
|-
|"Release Me"
| style="text-align:center;"|33
| style="text-align:center;"|—
| style="text-align:center;"|55
|Fastest Harp in the South|-
|rowspan=4|1974
|"Silver Threads and Golden Needles"
| style="text-align:center;"|68
| style="text-align:center;"|—
| style="text-align:center;"|—
|rowspan=3|The Nashville Hit Man|-
|"Boogie Woogie" (with Barefoot Jerry)
| style="text-align:center;"|22
| style="text-align:center;"|—
| style="text-align:center;"|24
|-
|"I Can't Help It"
| style="text-align:center;"|—
| style="text-align:center;"|—
| style="text-align:center;"|—
|-
|"Blue Christmas"
| style="text-align:center;"|—
| style="text-align:center;"|—
| style="text-align:center;"|—
|Christmas|-
|rowspan=4|1975
|"Everybody Stand Up and Holler for the Union"
| style="text-align:center;"|—
| style="text-align:center;"|—
| style="text-align:center;"|—
|rowspan=2|Charlie My Boy|-
|"Juke"
| style="text-align:center;"|—
| style="text-align:center;"|—
| style="text-align:center;"|—
|-
|"Pots and Pans"
| style="text-align:center;"|—
| style="text-align:center;"|—
| style="text-align:center;"|—
|Play It Again Charlie|-
|"Columbus Stockade Blues"
| style="text-align:center;"|—
| style="text-align:center;"|—
| style="text-align:center;"|—
|Harpin' the Blues|-
|1976
|"Wabash Cannonball"
| style="text-align:center;"|97
| style="text-align:center;"|—
| style="text-align:center;"|—
|rowspan=2|Play It Again Charlie|-
|rowspan=3|1977
|"Summit Ridge Drive" (with Barefoot Jerry)
| style="text-align:center;"|98
| style="text-align:center;"|—
| style="text-align:center;"|—
|-
|"Amazing Grace"
| style="text-align:center;"|—
| style="text-align:center;"|—
| style="text-align:center;"|—
|rowspan=2|Country Cookin'|-
|"Foggy River"
| style="text-align:center;"|—
| style="text-align:center;"|—
| style="text-align:center;"|—
|-
|rowspan=2|1978
|"Fair and Tender Ladies"
| style="text-align:center;"|30
| style="text-align:center;"|—
| style="text-align:center;"|35
|rowspan=4|Appalachian Fever|-
|"Drifting Lovers"
| style="text-align:center;"|96
| style="text-align:center;"|—
| style="text-align:center;"|—
|-
|rowspan=2|1979
|"Midnight Flyer"
| style="text-align:center;"|94
| style="text-align:center;"|—
| style="text-align:center;"|—
|-
|"Ramblin' Music Man"
| style="text-align:center;"|94
| style="text-align:center;"|—
| style="text-align:center;"|—
|-
|1981
|"Until the Night" (with Laney Smallwood)
| style="text-align:center;"|92
| style="text-align:center;"|—
| style="text-align:center;"|—
|rowspan=2|singles only
|-
|1983
|"The State of Our Union" (with Laney Smallwood as Laney Hicks)
| style="text-align:center;"|74
| style="text-align:center;"|—
| style="text-align:center;"|—
|-
|1989
|"I'm So Lonesome I Could Cry" (re-recording)
| style="text-align:center;"|—
| style="text-align:center;"|—
| style="text-align:center;"|—
|rowspan=2|13th|-
|1990
|"One O'Clock Jump"
| style="text-align:center;"|—
| style="text-align:center;"|—
| style="text-align:center;"|—
|}

 Collaborations 
 Highway 61 Revisited - Bob Dylan (1965)
 Blonde on Blonde - Bob Dylan (1966)
 John Wesley Harding - Bob Dylan (1967)
 Country, My Way - Nancy Sinatra (1967)
 How Great Thou Art - Elvis Presley (1967)
 The Way I Feel - Gordon Lightfoot (1967)
 I Stand Alone - Al Kooper (1968)
 One Day at a Time - Joan Baez (1969)
 Nashville Skyline - Bob Dylan (1970)
 Easy Does It - Al Kooper (1970)
 Blessed Are... - Joan Baez (1971)
 Elvis Country (I'm 10,000 Years Old) - Elvis Presley (1971)
 Yesterday's Wine - Willie Nelson (1971)
 Summer Side of Life - Gordon Lightfoot (1971)
 Come from the Shadows - Joan Baez (1972)
 Paul Simon - Paul Simon (1972)
 He Touched Me - Elvis Presley (1972)
 Really - J. J. Cale (1972)
 Rock and Roll Resurrection - Ronnie Hawkins (1972)
 Hank Wilson's Back Vol. I - Leon Russell (1973)Spider Jiving – Andy Fairweather Low (1974)
 Seven - Bob Seger (1974)
 Don't Stop Believin' - Olivia Newton-John (1976)
 Lovin' and Learnin' - Tanya Tucker (1976)
 Honest Lullaby - Joan Baez (1979)
 High Country Snows - Dan Fogelberg (1985)
 Girls Like Me - Tanya Tucker (1986)
 Greatest Hits Encore - Tanya Tucker (1990)
 Let There Be Peace on Earth - Vince Gill (1994)
 "Powder Blue" - Ween (1996)
 The Houston Kid - Rodney Crowell (2001)
 Fate's Right Hand - Rodney Crowell (2003)

Bibliography
 Kosser, Michael (2006), How Nashville Became Music City U.S.A: 50 Years of Music Row'', Hal Leonard Corp.,

References

External links
Nashvillesound.net
Charlie McCoy shows off his box of harmonicas – June 19, 2008 Interview for the NAMM Oral History Library

1941 births
Living people
American country harmonica players
People from Oak Hill, West Virginia
American session musicians
Grammy Award winners
Country Music Hall of Fame inductees
Members of the Country Music Association
Million Dollar Band (country music group) members
Monument Records artists
Step One Records artists
American country singer-songwriters
Country musicians from West Virginia
American country guitarists
American country bass guitarists
Guitarists from West Virginia
American male bass guitarists
American multi-instrumentalists
Steve Miller Band members
20th-century American bass guitarists
20th-century American male musicians
American male singer-songwriters
Singer-songwriters from West Virginia